Nymphicula monticola is a moth in the family Crambidae. It was described by David John Lawrence Agassiz in 2014. It is found in the highlands of New Guinea.

The wingspan is 17–18 mm. The base of the forewings is mixed pale fuscous and ochreous. The antemedian fascia is yellowish, bordered with white. The median area is scaled with dark brown. The base of the hindwings is fuscous.

Etymology
The species name refers to the mountainous area where the species is found.

References

Nymphicula
Moths described in 2014